Gejige is a village in the Osh Region of Kyrgyzstan. It is part of the Alay District. Its population was 129 in 2021.

Nearby towns and villages include Chong-Karakol and Kichi-Karakol.

References

Populated places in Osh Region